Dichomeris junisonensis is a moth in the family Gelechiidae. It was described by Shōnen Matsumura in 1931. It is found in Japan.

References

Moths described in 1931
junisonensis